The Jialingjiang Formation (嘉陵江组) is a geologic feature associated with the Sichuan Basin of China, generally underlying the area of the basin, with its origins dating to the Early Triassic period of geologic time, around a quarter of a billion years ago, and before. The Jialingjiang Formation is a geologic group feature upon the Yangtze Plate, which is a tectonic feature of the Earth's crust.

The Jialingjiang Formation is important to paleontologists or other people interested in ancient life forms due to the fossil evidence incorporated therein (such as for Eretmorhipis and other Ichthyosaur relatives). Also, scientific study of this formation group provides insight into Late  Triassic tectonic inversion based on analysis of detrital zircon U–Pb chronology (involving the element uranium converting to lead over time due to radioactive decay). The Jialingjiang Formation is also of interest in history as it has been a source for humans to extract valuable economic goods such as salt and natural gas for many centuries.

Hydrocarbon resources
The history of the Jialingjiang Formation explains the origins of the hydrocarbon resources which have historically or in the future may be extracted. The primary hydrocarbon resource of the Sichuan Basin is natural gas.

See also
2020 in reptile paleontology
Guanling Formation
Hupehsuchia
Zigong Salt History Museum

References 

Geologic formations of China
Triassic System of Asia
Triassic China